Kord Kandi (also Romanized as Kord Kandī; also known as Ḩoseyn ‘Alī Kandī-ye Kord and Ḩoseyn‘alī-ye Kandī Kord) is a village in Yowla Galdi Rural District, in the Central District of Showt County, West Azerbaijan Province, Iran. At the 2006 census, its population was 257, in 51 families.

References 

Populated places in Showt County